Tết Trung Thu (Chữ Hán: 節中秋) is a traditional Vietnamese festival held from the night of the 14th of the 8th lunar month to the end of the 15th of the 8th lunar month (Rằm tháng Tám). Despite its Chinese origin, recently this festival has become a children's festival (Tết Thiếu Nhi), also known as Tết Trông Trăng, Tết Đoàn Viên or Tết Hoa Đăng. Children look forward to this day because they are often given toys by adults, usually a star lamp, a mask, a kéo quân lamp, a tò he, and eat bánh trung thu (bánh nướng and bánh dẻo). On this day, people organize a feast to watch the moon. When the moon is high, children sing and dance while watching the full moon. In some places, people also organize lion dances or dragon dances for the children to enjoy.

Origins 
It has been clearly established that Tết Trung Thu originated from the Chinese culture. There are three main legends that are best known to talk about the Tết Trung Thu: Chang'e and Hou Yi, Emperor Tang Ming Huang in China ascending to the moon and the story of uncle Cuội of Vietnam.

The Chinese have celebrated the harvest during the autumn full moon since the Shang dynasty (c. 1600–1046 BCE). The term mid-autumn (中秋) first appeared in Rites of Zhou, a written collection of rituals of the Western Zhou dynasty (1046–771 BCE). The celebration as a festival only started to gain popularity during the early Tang dynasty (618–907 CE). One legend explains that Emperor Xuanzong of Tang started to hold formal celebrations in his palace after having explored the Moon-Palace.

According to Phan Kế Bính in the book of Việt Nam phong tục, the custom of hanging lights to display the feast was due to the ancient scriptures about Emperor Tang Ming Huang. On the birthday of Emperor Tang Ming Huang, he ordered people to hang lights everywhere and arrange a party to celebrate, and since then it has become a custom.

The tradition of lantern processions dates back to the Song Dynasty, due to the story that during the reign of Emperor Song Renzong in China, a carp became a monster, and every night the moon appeared to turn into a girl to harm people. At that time, a new mandarin Bao Gong ordered the folk to make a fish lamp like its image and then bring it out to play in the street so that it would be afraid and not dare to harm the people.

Also according to Phan Kế Bính, the custom of trống quân singing dates back to the reign of Emperor Quang Trung - Nguyễn Huệ, "when he brought troops to the North. Many soldiers were homesick." Nguyễn Huệ presented a way for both sides to pretend to be boys and girls, singing and responding to each other to make soldiers happy and not homesick. There is a drum beat as a beat, so it is called a trống quân (military drum).

Activities and customs 

According to Phan Kế Bính in the book of Việt Nam phong tục, "Our people in the 19th century, during the day, made offerings to their ancestors, and in the evening came to present a feast to enjoy the moon. At the beginning of the feast was moon cakes and used many kinds of fruit cakes, dyed a lot colorful, red blue, white and yellow. Girls in the street compete with each other ingenuity, peeling papaya into flowers, molding dough to make shrimp, whale...".

Children's toys in the Tết Trung Thu are made of paper and shaped like creatures such as butterflies, mantises, elephants, horses, unicorns, lions, dragons, deer, shrimps, and fish. During the evenings of the Tết Trung Thu, children play tug and catch, and have a procession of lanterns, lions, drums, and :vi:thanh la.

On this occasion, people buy moon cakes, tea, and wine to worship their ancestors in the evening when the full moon has just risen. Also on this day, people often give grandparents, parents, teachers, friends, relatives and other benefactors mooncakes, fruits, tea and wine. The Chinese often organize dragon dances on the occasion of the Tết Trung Thu, while the Vietnamese do lion dances. The lion symbolizes luck, prosperity and is a good omen for all families. In the past, Vietnamese people also held trống quân singing and hanging lanterns in kéo quân during the Tết Trung Thu. The drums are sung to the rhythm of three "thình, thùng, thình".

According to Vietnamese custom, during the Tết Trung Thu, adults arrange parties for children to celebrate the Tết Trung Thu, buy and make all kinds of candle-lit lanterns to hang in the house and let the children process the lights. The Tết Trung Thu includes moon cakes, candies, sugar cane, grapefruit and other fruits.

Lantern procession 
In some rural areas, where neighbors have closer relationships, people often organize so children can carry lanterns together through villages, hamlets and neighborhoods on the Mid-Autumn Festival night. Lantern festivals can be initiated by the local government or by youth groups in the village. They compete with each other to have the largest or prettiest lanterns in the procession. In Phan Thiết (Bình Thuận), a large-scale lantern procession was held with thousands of elementary and junior high school students marching through the streets. This festival was set as the largest record in Vietnam. This is a traditional mid-autumn lantern procession festival dating back hundreds of years, and the scale of the festival in Phan Thiết every year is bigger and bigger, but also more "commercial". In Tuyên Quang, there is also a large lantern procession festival, fully mobilized from the creativity of the people, from village to village and has not been commercialized.

Lion dance 

Lion dance is usually held before the Tết Trung Thu, but the busiest are the fifteenth and sixteenth nights.

Party 

The usual Tết Trung Thu with the focus on the dog is made of grapefruit cloves, with two black beans attached as eyes. Around there are more fruits and cakes like bánh nướng, bánh dẻo or vegetarian cakes in the shape of a mother pig with a herd of chubby piglets, or a carp are popular images. Grapefruit seeds are usually peeled and skewered on steel wires, dried for 2–3 weeks before the full moon, and on the Tết Trung Thu night, the strings of grapefruit seeds are brought to light the typical fruits and foods of this occasion are bananas and nuggets, apricots, red and blue pickled persimmons, a few daisies, and grapefruit is an indispensable fruit. When the moon reaches the top of the head is the moment to break the feast, everyone will enjoy the taste of the Mid-Autumn Festival.

The custom of looking at the moon is also related to the legend of Uncle Cuội on the moon, because one day Cuội was away, the precious banyan tree was uprooted and flew up into the sky, uncle Cuội clung to the tree roots but could not and was flown. to the moon with his tree. Looking up at the Moon, one can see a clear black spot in the shape of an old tree with people sitting under it, and children believe that it is a picture of uncle Cuội sitting at the base of a banyan tree.

Making Tết Trung Thu toys 
Masks, lion lights, star lights and lion heads are the most popular toys during the Mid-Autumn Festival. In the South, the two cities of Hội An and Saigon are famous throughout the country for the craft of making decorative lanterns and paper lanterns used in the Tết Trung Thu. Previously in the North, during the subsidy period (1976 - 1986), toys for children during the Tết Trung Thu were very rare. Most families often made their own toys such as bỏi drums, lanterns, monk lamps, star lamps, kéo quân lamps, masks, tò he, and pinwheels for children in the family. There are also toy ship models. The masks are usually made of paperboard or cardboard, with popular images of children's favorite characters at that time such as: lion head, Ông Địa, Sun Wukong, Zhubajie, or Baigu jing. Today, most toys in Vietnam come from China, and the masks are made of thin plastic.

Types of Trung thu cakes (moon cakes) 

From traditional to modern, moon cakes are increasingly diversified as manufacturers get creative in using different ingredients and foods into the filling; stamping cake designs into many vivid shapes; Packed with beautifully designed packaging. However, based on the recipe for making the crust, there are only two types of bánh Trung thu: bánh nướng (baked cakes) and bánh dẻo (flexible cakes).

Bánh nướng 
Bánh nướng are made with a crust of flour and a little oil. Sugar to mix into the crust is usually cooked with malt to turn amber and keep for as long as possible (usually after the Tết Trung Thu, bakers cook sugar water, store it well until the next season to use). In the past, in Vietnam, the filling for pies was usually mixed, with a little bit of lime leaves, fatty meat, jam, melon seeds, and sausages.

After molding the cake, pressing the mold, the cake is put in the oven. The baking process is divided into two stages of which about 2/3 of the baking time is the first stage. After that, the cake is unloaded, cooled, covered with egg yolk and then baked for the remaining 1/3 of the time.

Bánh dẻo 
Traditionally, mooncakes are made with the shell of roasted and finely ground glutinous rice flour, boiled and cooled white sugar water (not using malt as in pies), juice from pomelo flowers. The filling is made from cooked foods and ingredients. The cake is molded and pressed and can be used immediately without needing to be in the oven.

Singing Trống quân 
Tết Trung Thu in the North also has the custom of singing trống quân. The male and female sides sing and respond to each other, while beating on a barbed wire or steel wire stretched on an empty barrel, popping out "thình thùng thình" sounds as the rhythm for the song. The songs are used to sing along with the rhyme, according to their own ideas, or sometimes they are familiar, sometimes they are improvised. The confrontation in the drum singing sessions is very fun and sometimes difficult because of the difficult puzzles.

Give a gift 
On Tết Trung Thu, people often give gifts to each other. Gifts are usually boxes of cakes, lanterns, clothes, money. Agencies and businesses also give gifts to customers and employees, sometimes even buying mooncake trucks many companies have thousands of workers, order thousands of boxes of cakes with generous commissionscalculated on the total amount of moon cakes consumed in 2006 (statistics from manufacturers) is estimated at 6,500-6,800 tons, taking the average price of a box of 220-250g cakes about 100,000-130,000 VND, consumers have spent more than 800 billion VND for about 7 million boxes of cakes. And the boxes of cakes were as expensive as gold, and the poor could not afford them  kept running around from one to the other.

The object of gift giving by adults is usually superiors such as parents, superiors, people in need, teachers or also neighbors, friends or children in the house. Usually, the more important the recipient of the gift, the higher the value of the gift must be. Giving Tết Trung Thu gifts is a common habit when life improves after Đổi Mới.

For businesses or individuals, not having Tết Trung Thu gifts can be seen as negligent or shameful, so this is not a small expense when it comes to the Tết Trung Thu. The cost of giving gifts is usually spent from the cost of receiving guests in cash. Due to the high commission or discount of bakeries (maybe up to 35%) many people prefer to use agency money to benefit.

The giving of expensive Tết Trung Thu gifts is a "graceful" occasion for adults. Many people often take advantage of this occasion to give gifts to buy and sell officials. The thick boxes of moon cakes with the "gold" and "dollar" filling inside have influenced many officials, and giving gifts during the Tết Trung Thu is a custom of these ingredients.

Watching the moon 
People often watch the moon on the night of the Tết Trung Thu because this is the best time to see the moon

 Muốn ăn lúa tháng Năm, trông trăng rằm tháng Tám.
 Tỏ trăng Mười Bốn được tằm, đục trăng hôm Rằm thì được lúa chiêm.

Tết Trung Thu in literature and art

Poetry about Tết Trung Thu 
The poet Tản Đà also mentioned the Tết Trung with the following verses:
Có bầu có bạn can chi tủi
Cùng gió cùng mây thế mới vui
Rồi cứ mỗi năm rằm tháng tám
Tựa nhau trông xuống thế gian cười.
Nguyễn Du
Khi chén rượu khi cuộc cờ,
Khi xem hoa nở khi chờ trăng lên

Songs about Tết Trung Thu 

Musician Lê Thương wrote a song about this topic, Thằng Cuội, in the song, there is a passage "Bóng trăng trắng ngà có cây đa to, có thằng Cuội già ôm một mối mơ.....Có con dế mèn, suốt trong đêm thâu, hát xẩm không tiền, nên nghèo xác xơ...".

Musician Ngọc Lễ has a piece titled Cắc tùng cắc tùng about the Tết Trung Thu for children: "Cắc tùng cắc cắc tùng, Em đi chơi trung thu này, Cắc tùng tiếng trống lân tưng bừng...."

Tết Trung Thu toys 

When it comes to Tết Trung Thu toys, we have to talk about lanterns, which are indispensable for children to go to the moon procession. From the past to the present, the two cities of Hội An and Saigon are famous throughout the country for the craft of making decorative lanterns and paper lanterns used in the Tết Trung Thu. According to Văn Công Lý now living in Hội An, the ancestor of the lantern making industry here is called Xã Đường. Unique Hội An lanterns are few places, Hội An lanterns are beautiful thanks to all shapes, designs, large and small. The fabric covering the lamp instead of paper is the famous Hà Đông silk, making the light more magical and shimmering.

In Saigon, from before 1975 until now, Phú Bình in District 11 of Saigon is still the largest center for the production of Trung Thu lanterns in South Vietnam, supplying the whole region. This is a migrant village in 1954, originally from Báo Đáp village in Nam Định province. This village in Northern is famous for its dyeing industry. When coming to the Southern, people still live together by dyeing, weaving and making shoes. Phú Bình after 1975 is located in the area of Phú Trung ward, Tân Phú district and Ward 5, District 11, Ho Chi Minh City, about half a kilometer from Đầm Sen tourist area. At first, when coming to the South, Phú Bình only specialized in producing simple Tết Trung Thu lights such as flute lights, fish, stars... intentionally for students to have fun on the holiday night.

From 1960 to 1975, Phú Bình annually produced more than half a million mid-autumn lanterns, supplying all provinces from Bến Hải to Cà Mau. After that, the people in the area continued to do their old jobs. In 1994, Chinese lanterns massively infiltrated the Vietnamese market, suppressing Phú Bình lamps, making the people here suffer from starvation because the goods were delayed because of the beautiful Chinese lanterns, new style, very convenient when going out in the wind, not afraid of burning because of the battery, the price is cheap.

In Vietnam market, the technology industry to produce toys for children on the occasion of the Tết Trung Thu helps create jobs and profits for many small and medium enterprises, due to common materials and simple technology, little capital, after a time for Chinese toys to dominate the market until 2006 Vietnamese lantern production recovered and re-occupy the domestic market.

See also 
 List of harvest festivals
 Tết Nguyên Đán
 Tết Đoan Ngọ
 Tsukimi, the Japanese autumn harvest festival held on the same day
 Chuseok, the Korean autumn harvest festival held on the same day
 Mid-Autumn Festival, the Chinese Moon-observance festival held on the same day

References

External links 
 
 Bác Hồ viết thơ Trung thu cho thiếu nhi
 Trung thu là tết thiếu nhi mà sao tràn ngập hoài niệm của người lớn?

Festivals in Vietnam
Harvest festivals
Lunar observation
September observances
October observances
Moon in culture